Jim Johnson (May 26, 1941July 28, 2009) was an American football coach, formerly serving as defensive coordinator with the Philadelphia Eagles. Widely regarded as one of the best defensive coordinators in the National Football League (NFL), he was especially known for being a master architect of blitzes, disguising them skillfully and keeping offenses off balance.

In more than 40 years of coaching, Johnson held head coaching duties only once (at the collegiate level), but was interviewed by the Arizona Cardinals regarding their head coaching vacancy in 2004.

Playing career
A native of Maywood, Illinois, Johnson played high school football for Proviso East High School in Maywood, Illinois.  He played college football for head coach Dan Devine at the University of Missouri from 1959 to 1962. An all-Big Eight quarterback, Johnson played in the same backfield with long-time NFL executive Bill Tobin. He went undrafted in the 1963 NFL Draft, but was signed to play tight end by the Buffalo Bills of the AFL (1963–64).

Coaching career

Johnson began his coaching career as head coach at Missouri Southern (1967–68), before serving four-year tenures at Drake University (1969–72) and Indiana University (1973–76). In 1977, Johnson was hired by his former head coach at Missouri, Dan Devine, as defensive backs coach at University of Notre Dame. After helping the 1977 Fighting Irish to win the national championship in his first year, Johnson was later promoted to defensive coordinator and assistant head coach under Gerry Faust.

Leaving Notre Dame in 1984, Johnson coached in the short-lived USFL with the Oklahoma Outlaws (1984) and Jacksonville Bulls (1985). In 1986, he finally entered the NFL as a coach, spending eight seasons with the St. Louis/Phoenix Cardinals (1986–93).  After overseeing the Cards defensive line for four seasons, Johnson excelled as their secondary coach, helping Aeneas Williams become the first rookie cornerback to lead the league in interceptions (6) since 1981.

In 1994, he joined the Indianapolis Colts as linebackers coach under head coach Ted Marchibroda. After defensive coordinator Vince Tobin left the Colts in 1996 to become head coach of the Cardinals, Johnson was deemed his successor by new Colts head coach Lindy Infante. The Colts finished last in the AFC East in 1997, causing Infante and his staff to be fired.

Johnson spent the 1998 NFL season as linebackers coach on the final staff of Seattle Seahawks head coach Dennis Erickson, before leaving for Philadelphia. He helped the Seahawks register 10 TDs on defense, including 8 INTs returned for scores, 2nd most in NFL history. If Johnson had stayed, he could have stepped into the coordinator's role when Fritz Shurmur died of cancer that summer.

On January 22, 1999, Eagles head coach Andy Reid targeted and hired Jim Johnson as the Eagles new defensive coordinator. Johnson's tenure in Philadelphia was his most successful, as the Eagles won 5 division titles, each reaping the benefits of his defenses. Because head coach Andy Reid is known more for his acumen on the offensive side of the ball, he handed complete control of the defensive unit of the team to Johnson, allowing Reid to concentrate on running the offense with his offensive coordinators, Brad Childress and later Marty Mornhinweg.

Reid repeatedly said he had full confidence in Johnson and the Eagles rewarded him accordingly, as he became one of the highest paid coordinators in the NFL.  "As I've said many times, Jim Johnson is the best in the business at what he does", said Reid upon signing his prized defensive coordinator to a lucrative four-year contract extension in 2005. "His defensive units continue to produce at a very high level as he puts a lot of pressure on opposing offenses."
From 2000–07, Johnson's units rank tied for first in the NFL with 342 sacks, second in the league in 3rd down efficiency (34.3%) and red zone touchdown percentage (43.0%), and fourth in fewest points allowed (17.6 per game).

In 2001, Johnson's unit became the fourth team in NFL history to go all 16 games without allowing more than 21 points. Their streak of allowing 21 or fewer in 34 straight games was second longest in NFL history (Minnesota, 1968–71). In 1999, Johnson's unit forced an NFL-best 46 turnovers, including a team-record 5 interceptions returned for TDs.

Eagles defenders were selected for the Pro Bowl 26 times during Johnson's tenure. Former Eagle Brian Dawkins led the way with seven. Other Eagles defenders to go to the Pro Bowl under Johnson include Troy Vincent (five), Jeremiah Trotter (four), Hugh Douglas (three), Lito Sheppard (two), and Trent Cole, Michael Lewis, Asante Samuel, Corey Simon, Bobby Taylor (one each).

Current NFL head coaches John Harbaugh (special teams and defensive backs), Ron Rivera (linebackers), and Sean McDermott (defensive backs and linebackers) coached under Johnson with the Eagles.

Illness and death
Shortly after the Eagles were eliminated from the playoffs, on January 29, 2009, it was announced that Johnson was undergoing treatment for melanoma. In mid-May, Johnson announced a leave of absence due to the advancement of the cancer, with secondary coach Sean McDermott taking over duties as the interim defensive coordinator.

On July 24, 2009, Johnson officially resigned as defensive coordinator, with McDermott having the interim tag removed. Four days later, on July 28, 2009, Johnson died at the Hospital of the University of Pennsylvania at the age of 68.

Head coaching record

College

References

1941 births
2009 deaths
American football quarterbacks
American football tight ends
Arizona Cardinals coaches
Buffalo Bills players
Indianapolis Colts coaches
Missouri Southern Lions football coaches
Missouri Tigers football players
Notre Dame Fighting Irish football coaches
Seattle Seahawks coaches
Philadelphia Eagles coaches
National Football League defensive coordinators
United States Football League coaches
Sportspeople from Maywood, Illinois
Deaths from melanoma
Deaths from cancer in Pennsylvania
American Football League players